F. Colombari was an Italian officer and painter who served at the Qajar Iranian court and in the army between 1833 and 1848.

Biography

Colombari was an engineer and watercolour artist, and originally hailed from Piedmont. In 1833, after gaining the rank of colonel, he moved to Qajar Iran. While in Iran, he served in the army between 1833-1848, and also belonged to a circle of artists close to the young crown prince Naser al-Din Shah Qajar. Colombari himself, in particular, was a close confidant of the latter.

During the tenure of prime minister Haji Mirza Aqasi, Colombari assisted him in reorganizing the army and the production of weapons at the Tehran arsenal. Colombari made numerous paintings and may have personally known Hasan Ghaffari, better known as Sani ol molk. In 1844, Colombari made a watercolour painting of Naser ad-din Shah Qajar. In 1847, he made a watercolour portrait of Mohammad Shah Qajar, the successor to Naser ad-din Shah on the throne.

References

Sources

Further reading

 M. M. Eskandari-Qajar, “Mohammad Shah Qajar’s Nezam-e Jadid and Colonel Colombari’s Zambourakchis,” Qajar Studies 5, 2005, pp. 52–79.
 L. Thornton, Images de Perse: Le voyage du Colonel F. Colombari à la cour du Chah de Perse de 1833 à 1848, Paris, 1981.

Military personnel from Piedmont
Painters from Piedmont
Italian expatriates in Iran
Iranian military commanders
People of Qajar Iran
Italian engineers